East Tamaki Rugby Football Club is a rugby union club based in Auckland, New Zealand. The club was established in 1962 and is affiliated with the Auckland Rugby Football Union.

History
East Tamaki was initially founded as a "branch" of Otahuhu RFC. However, with the influx of Polynesian immigrants to the Ōtara and East Tāmaki area in the 1960s, East Tamaki broke away from Otahuhu, becoming an independent club in 1962. Today, the club has junior and senior teams, with age grades ranging from under-6 to over-60. To date, the club has never won the Gallaher Shield, the premier senior men's trophy in Auckland rugby.

International players
The club has produced a number of players who have gone on to play international rugby:

New Zealand
Eric Rush
Pita Alatini

Manu Samoa
Peter Fatialofa
Francis Leilua
Junior Paramore
Ngapaku Ngapaku
Mark Luafalealo
Koki Avei
Tupo Fa'amasino

Tonga
Talai Fifita
Sam Alatini
Tony Alatini

External links
Club website
Auckland RFU club profile

Sport in Auckland
New Zealand rugby union teams